Bombay Dreams is a Swedish comedy film from 2004.

Plot
Ebba is adopted from India she is wondering who her real mom is. One day she finds a letter in a wardrobe from her biological mother, she decides to travel to India without the knowledge of her parents home in Sweden.

Cast
Gayathri Mudigonda - Ebba
Nadine Kirschon - Camilla
Sissela Kyle - Anita
Peter Dalle - Camillas pappa
Viktor Källander - Erik
Dolly Minhas - Ebbas biological mother
Amit P. Pandey - Rupesh
Linn Staberg - Katja
Peter Sjöberg - Rikard

Awards
Nadine Kirschon won Best Actress 2005 at the GAFFA - International Film Festival for Young People in Austria in 2005 for her role in Bombay Dreams.

References

External links

2004 films
2004 comedy films
Films set in Mumbai
Swedish comedy films
2000s Swedish-language films
Films directed by Lena Koppel
Desi films
Films set in India
Films shot in India
Films shot in Mumbai
2000s Swedish films